The 1948 South Korean Constitutional Assembly election took place on 10 May 1948. It was held under the American military occupation, with supervision from the United Nations, and resulted in a victory for the National Association for the Rapid Realisation of Korean Independence, which won 55 of the 200 seats, although 85 were held by independents. Voter turnout was 95.5%.

Background
The elections were a milestone in Korean political history. The Korean people had not previously experienced democracy under written constitutional rule; the very foundation of South Korean politics were still under construction and were unstable. The elections would lead to a constitution, roughly based on the constitution of the United States, and establish democracy in South Korea.

In 1948, the subject of an election of any kind in South Korea was an issue worldwide. On 8 and 9 March 1948, UN delegates from Australia, Canada, India, and Syria expressed their doubts and some complete rejection of the elections on 10 May 1948 for South Korea. The U.N. delegates were concerned by Korea's political maturity at the time, feeling that the elections might not validly express the popular will in a country which had only been independent for four years. Some Korean politicians, such as Kim Koo and Kim Kyu-sik, denounced the election as it would dash the hopes of reunification with North Korea. However, a vote in the South Korean Interim Legislature on 10 March ruled 40 to 0 in favor of holding the election.

The elections were originally intended to be held throughout the Korean peninsula, but Soviet Union forces and Kim Il-sung refused the UN supervisors entry into North Korea for the elections. They were therefore held only in the US-administered territory, making the elections a purely South Korean event. Because of this, Kim Koo and Kim Kyu-sik denounced the elections as they would dash hopes of reunification with North Korea, but could not prevent them from happening. The voters elected members of a constitutional convention, which then voted on the constitution and re-convened as the national legislature to elect the president. At the proceedings, they left one hundred seats open in the Constituent National Assembly for North Koreans to vote on when they were able.

The election system corresponded to the same limited system that had been established under the Japanese. In larger towns, only landowners and taxpayers could vote, while in small towns, elders voted on behalf of everyone else.

The elections were marred by terrorism resulting in 600 deaths between March and May. In April, North Korea, supposedly in an effort to delay the elections, sponsored a unity conference in Pyongyang to promote reunification of the two Koreas, which both Kim Koo and Kim Kyu-sik attended. The conference was inconclusive towards any upcoming reunification, and did not delay the elections.

The people of Jeju island saw the election as a unilateral attempt by the United States military government under the flag of United Nations to separate a southern regime and to employ its first president Syngman Rhee, The Jeju uprising occurred, during which tens of thousands of Jeju people were killed.

The elections were the first time in Korean history that the citizens were allowed to vote for a national legislative body. The Korean peninsula had been under Japanese colonial rule for thirty-five years (1910–1945), and for hundreds of years before that, it had been governed by the (Yi Dynasty) Korean royal family and scholarly officials.

Results

By city/province

See also
List of members of the South Korean Constituent Assembly, 1948–50
1946 North Korean local elections
1947 North Korean local elections
People's Republic of Korea

References

External links

Legislative elections in South Korea
1948 elections in South Korea
Allied occupation of Korea
Election and referendum articles with incomplete results